Adad-nirari III (also Adad-narari) was a King of Assyria from 811 to 783 BC. Note that this assumes that the longer version of the Assyrian Eponym List, which has an additional eponym for Adad-nirari III, is the correct one. For the shorter eponym list the ascension year would be 810 BC.

Family 
Adad-nirari was a son and successor of king Shamshi-Adad V, and was apparently quite young at the time of his accession, because for the first five years of his reign, his mother Shammuramat was highly influential, which has given rise to the legend of Semiramis.

It is widely rejected that his mother acted as regent, but she was surprisingly influential for the time period.

He was the father of kings Ashur-nirari V, Shalmaneser IV, and Ashur-dan III. Tiglath-Pileser III described himself as a son of Adad-nirari in his inscriptions, but it is uncertain if this is true.

Biography 

Adad-nirari's youth, and the struggles his father had faced early in his reign, caused a serious weakening of Assyrian rulership over their indigenous Mesopotamia, and made way for the ambitions of officers, governors, and local rulers.

According to Adad-nirari's inscriptions, he led several military campaigns with the purpose of regaining the strength Assyria enjoyed in the times of his grandfather Shalmaneser III.

According to the eponym canon, he campaigned in all directions until the last of his 28 years of reign (783 BC), and he was the builder of the temple of Nabu at Nineveh. Among his actions was a siege of Damascus in the time of Ben-Hadad III in 796 BC, which led to the eclipse of the Aramaean Kingdom of Damascus and allowed the recovery of Israel under Jehoash (who paid the Assyrian king tribute at this time) and Jeroboam II. 

Despite Adad-nirari's vigour, Assyria entered a several-decades-long period of weakness following his death.

See also
 Calah Slab
 Saba'a Stele
 Shamshi-ilu
 Tell al-Rimah stela

References

External link

9th-century BC births
Year of birth unknown
783 BC deaths
9th-century BC Assyrian kings
8th-century BC Assyrian kings
Ancient child monarchs
Kings of the Universe